Canadian Pacific Railway N-2-a, b, and c class locomotives were a class of 199 2-8-0 or Consolidation type locomotives built by Montreal Locomotive Works in 1912–1914. They were numbered 3600–3799 by CP and were used almost everywhere around the system.

Construction history
The order for these engines came around 1912 when CP wanted bigger locomotives for their mainline.  Their current engines were wearing out and were too small for the loads that were being hauled.  The Montreal Locomotive Works was the one who did the job.

Modifications
These locomotives were originally numbered 3800–3999.  They were renumbered between 1920 and 1929 renumbered  to the 3600 and 3700s. Most of the class were converted to oil-firing in the later years.

In the 1920s onward Canadian Pacific saw an increasing need for larger locomotives.  Most of this class were relocated to either CP's Ogden or Montreal shops for a short time while 65 were converted to Class P1n 2-8-2 renumbered 5200-5264 in 1946 a larger boiler was added as well as a trailing truck and a new cab.  They could haul several more thousand pounds than the original 2-8-0's could.  Many of this class were converted, although not all, as many survived as 2-8-0's until the end of steam on CP.

Preservation
Of the 199 locomotives that were built, only four remain in existence. 
3512 still exists, although not in a heritage park.  On January 1, 1947, 3512 was returning to Nelson, British Columbia, when the rail barge tipped and the entire train fell into the water.  The complete engine, with tender, caboose, and snowplow, still reside at the bottom of Slocan Lake, in relatively good condition, well preserved in the deep, fresh water. 
Engine 3651 was saved and is displayed in Lethbridge.  
3716 was used on the British Columbia Museum Train for many years, also serving as a backup locomotive to the 2860 Royal Hudson.  It was leased by the Kettle Valley Steam Railway in 2003, and there it hauls the excursions.
3522 is on display in Bienfait, Saskatchewan.

See also

List of heritage railways in Canada
Kettle Valley Steam Railway

References

External links
 Kettle Valley Steam Railway
 Kettle Valley Consolidations, part 2 Kettle Valley Model Railway
 Kettle Valley Consolidations, part 3 Kettle Valley Model Railway

2-8-0 locomotives
Steam locomotives of Canada
N-2-a,b,c
MLW locomotives
Railway locomotives introduced in 1912
Standard gauge locomotives of Canada